Shady Oak is an unincorporated community in northern Fairfax County, Virginia, United States. Shady Oak is primarily a residential community on the Potomac River.

References

Unincorporated communities in Fairfax County, Virginia
Unincorporated communities in Virginia
Washington metropolitan area
Virginia populated places on the Potomac River